Soner Demirtaş (born 25 June 1991) is a Turkish freestyle wrestler who competes in the 74 kg division. He won the European title in 2016, 2017 and 2018. He was bronze medalist at the Rio Olympics.  He is a member of the Ankara ASKI.

Personal life
Soner Demirtaş was born to a butcher father as the third son of five in Çat village of Tokat on 25 June 1991. He is a student of physical education and sports at Karamanoğlu Mehmetbey University in Karaman. His three brothers are also sport wrestlers. He was inspired to take up wrestling by his eldest brother Bekir Demirtaş.

Sports career
Demirtaş internationally debuted at the Freestyle Wrestling – Junior World Championships 2010 held in Budapest, Hungary, where he captured the silver medal.

He took part at the 2012 European Wrestling Championships in Belgrade, Serbia.

He participated at the 2013 European Championships in Tbilisi, Georgia. He won the gold medal at the 2013 Mediterranean Games in Mersin, Turkey. He lost to Belarusian Ali Shabanau in the round of 16 at the 2013 World Championships in Budapest, Hungary.

He won the bronze medal at the 2014 European Championships in Vantaa, Finland. Demirtaş lost to Jumber Kvelashvili of Georgia in the round of 32 at the 2014 World Championships in Tashkent, Uzbekistan.

He became silver medalist at the 2015 European Games in Baku, Azerbaijan. He lost to Narsingh Pancham Yadav from India in the round of 16 at the 2015 World Championships in Las Vegas, United States. Demirtaş became a second time European champion in 2017 at Novi Sad, Serbia.

In March 2021, he competed at the European Qualification Tournament in Budapest, Hungary hoping to qualify for the 2020 Summer Olympics in Tokyo, Japan.

In 2022, he won the gold medal in his event at the Yasar Dogu Tournament held in Istanbul, Turkey. He competed in the 74kg event at the 2022 World Wrestling Championships held in Belgrade, Serbia.

References

External links 
 

1991 births
Living people
Turkish male sport wrestlers
Sportspeople from Tokat
Karamanoğlu Mehmetbey University alumni
Istanbul Büyükşehir Belediyespor athletes
Wrestlers at the 2015 European Games
European champions for Turkey
European Games silver medalists for Turkey
Wrestlers at the 2016 Summer Olympics
Olympic wrestlers of Turkey
Olympic bronze medalists for Turkey
Olympic medalists in wrestling
Medalists at the 2016 Summer Olympics
Mediterranean Games gold medalists for Turkey
Competitors at the 2013 Mediterranean Games
Mediterranean Games medalists in wrestling
Wrestlers at the 2019 European Games
European Games medalists in wrestling
World Wrestling Championships medalists
European Wrestling Championships medalists
Islamic Solidarity Games medalists in wrestling
Islamic Solidarity Games competitors for Turkey
20th-century Turkish people
21st-century Turkish people
European Wrestling Champions